The 30th TCA Awards were held on July 19, 2014, in a ceremony, hosted by Terry Crews, at The Beverly Hilton in Beverly Hills, California. The Television Critics Association announced their nominees on May 27, 2014.

Winners and nominees

Multiple wins 
The following shows received multiple wins:

Multiple nominations 
The following shows received multiple nominations:

References

External links
Official website

2014 television awards
2014 in American television
TCA Awards ceremonies